Woman Made to Measure is a 1940 German comedy film directed by Helmut Käutner and starring Hans Söhnker, Leny Marenbach and Dorit Kreysler. Produced by Terra Film, it was shot at the Babelsberg Studios in Berlin. The film's sets were designed by the art director Willi Herrmann. It was based on the play of the same title by Erich Kästner.

Cast
 Hans Söhnker as Christian Bauer
 Leny Marenbach as Annemarie / Rosemarie
 Dorit Kreysler as Fräulein Zettlund
Fritz Odemar as Dr. Paul Buchmann
 Hilde Hildebrand as Hermine Campe
 Walter Steinbeck as Theaterdirektor Julius Campe
 Hugo Schrader as Dr. Gärtner
 Hermann Pfeiffer as Richard Höllenkamp
 Ursula Herking as Hausmädchen Anna
 Alice Treff as Fräulein Mümmelmann
 Erika von Thellmann as Dame im Wartezimmer
 Tibor Halmay as Birkbusch
 Hadrian Maria Netto as Prof. Häberfeld
 Wilhelm Groothe as Toni
 Wilhelm Bendow as Schmott
 Margarete Kupfer as Tante Rose
 Charly Berger as Ein wartender Mann am Standesamt
 Wilhelm Egger-Sell as Mann am Standesamt mit dem guten Rat
 Angelo Ferrari as Christians Sitznachbar in der Theaterloge
 Aribert Grimmer as Frischgebackener Ehemann am Standesamt
 Karl Harbacher as Die Violine im Orchester
 Charlie Kracker as Bühnenarbeiter
 Paul Mehler as Junger Mann am Standesamt mit den Zwillingen
 Armin Münch as Standesbeamter
 Ewald Wenck as Theaterinspizient

References

Bibliography 
 Hull, David Stewart. Film in the Third Reich: A Study of the German Cinema, 1933–1945. University of California Press, 1969.

External links 
 

1940 films
Films of Nazi Germany
German comedy films
1940 comedy films
1940s German-language films
Films based on works by Erich Kästner
Films directed by Helmut Käutner
Terra Film films
German black-and-white films
1940s German films
Films shot at Babelsberg Studios